Shiner was a British humoristic comic strip drawn by Mike Lacey. It was published in the magazine Whizzer and Chips, where the character first appeared in the second issue in 1969. Whizzer and Chips characters were divided into "Whizz-kids" and "Chip-ites", reflecting respectively the two sections of the comic. Shiner was the leader of the "Chip-ites". He was an amateur boxer, constantly getting into trouble with his mother, who disapproved of his activity. Shiner usually ended up getting a black eye in each issue, hence his name (in 20th-century British English, shiner has a colloquial meaning of "black eye").

British comic strips
British comics characters
Fictional boxers
Boxing comics
Comics characters introduced in 1969
1969 comics debuts
1990 comics endings
Gag-a-day comics
Child characters in comics
Male characters in comics
Defunct British comics
Comics set in the United Kingdom
Unlike most of the Whizzer and Chips characters, Shiner was not transferred into Buster and thus was terminated in 1990.